

Ernst Hammer (20 October 1884 – 2 December 1957) was a German-Austrian officer of four armies since 1 October 1903, entering as a one-year volunteer. He was Oberleutnant of the Common Army, Hauptmann of the k.u.k. Armee, Generalmajor of the Bundesheer (transferred to the German Army 15 March 1938), Generalleutnant of the Wehrmacht during World War II. He was a recipient of the Knight's Cross of the Iron Cross. As commander of the 75th Infantry Division, he ordered his soldiers to shoot female Soviet POWs on the spot.

Awards and decorations
 Military Merit Cross, 3rd Class with War Decoration and Swords  (Austria-Hungary, World War I)
 Military Merit Medal, in Silver and in Bronze (Austria-Hungary, World War I)
 Karl Troop Cross (World War I)
 Gallipoli Star (World War I)
 Austrian War Commemorative Medal
 Hungarian War Commemorative Medal
 Honour Cross of the World War 1914/1918
 Iron Cross (1914)
 2nd Class
 1st Class
 Clasps to the Iron Cross
 2nd Class
 1st Class
 Eastern Front Medal
 Knight's Cross of the Iron Cross on 20 December 1941 as Generalleutnant and commander of 75. Infanterie-Division

References

 

Citations

1884 births
1957 deaths
Austro-Hungarian military personnel of World War I
Lieutenant generals of the German Army (Wehrmacht)
Recipients of the clasp to the Iron Cross, 1st class
Recipients of the Knight's Cross of the Iron Cross
World War II prisoners of war held by the United States
Austrian generals
Austrian military personnel of World War II
People from Sokolov
German Bohemian people
Austro-Hungarian Army officers
Austrian prisoners of war
Nazi war criminals